Zixi County is a county in the northeast of Jiangxi province, People's Republic of China, bordering Fujian province to the east. It is under the jurisdiction of the prefecture-level city of Fuzhou.

Administrative divisions
In the present, Zixi County has 5 towns and 2 townships.
5 towns

2 townships
 Gaotian
 Shixia

Demographics 

Climate

Notes and references 

 
County-level divisions of Jiangxi
Fuzhou, Jiangxi